Charles McHugh (1870–1931) was an American film actor of the silent era. He frequently played Irish characters in a mixture of comedies and westerns.

Selected filmography

 Down to Earth (1917)
 The Goat (1918)
 Fame and Fortune (1918)
 Rustling a Bride (1919)
 Smiling All the Way (1920)
 La La Lucille (1920)
 Be My Wife (1921)
 A Shocking Night (1921)
 The Beautiful and Damned (1922)
 The Eagle's Feather (1923)
 The Girl of the Golden West (1923)
 Cupid's Fireman (1923)
 Babbitt (1924)
 The Trouble Shooter (1924)
 Brand of Cowardice (1925)
 Smilin' at Trouble (1925)
 The Golden Cocoon (1925)
 Lights of Old Broadway (1925)
 The Sporting Lover (1926)
 The Waning Sex (1926)
 The Prince of Broadway (1926)
 Finnegan's Ball (1927)
 The Princess from Hoboken (1927)
 Phantom of the Range (1928)
 The Quitter (1929)
 Smiling Irish Eyes (1929)

References

Bibliography
 Katchmer, George A. A Biographical Dictionary of Silent Film Western Actors and Actresses. McFarland, 2015.

External links

1870 births
1931 deaths
American male film actors
Male actors from  Philadelphia